US Quadball, previously known as US Quidditch, is a non-profit organization that governs the sport of quadball in the United States of America. Quadball is a sport that combines elements of lacrosse, dodgeball, and rugby. The sport is played at more than 100 colleges in the United States.

History
Quadball was founded in 2005 by Xander Manshel, a then-freshman at Middlebury College in Middlebury, Vermont, Alex Benepe, and several of their friends. The rules were originally derived from the fictional sport of Quidditch, from the fantasy novel and movie series Harry Potter. Gameplay included elements similar to lacrosse, dodgeball, and rugby.

In October 2005, the first quadball game was played at Battell Beach in Middlebury, Vermont. Around 30 players showed up to play the game. In 2007, the first quadball World Cup was played between Middlebury College and Vassar College. By this time, quadbal had become the most popular club on campus at Middlebury College. In 2008, students took a spring break road trip to see quadbal played at six college campuses in the Mid-Atlantic. This trip was aired on MTV, increasing interest in the game. The third World Cup took place in October 2009 with 2,000 spectators and 21 teams which made it the biggest tournament to date.

In March 2010, US quadball or USQ was made into a 501(c)3 nonprofit organization. The first meeting of the United States quadball Association was held in May with the directors of the organization. In November, the first away game was held in Manhattan. The fourth quadball World Cup was held here as well, and 46 teams competed. This event lasted two days, attracting media attention and 15,000 spectators. In February 2011, the first Trans-Continental game was played between students of Vassar College in New York and University of Vaasa in Finland. In March 2011, the USQ held its first regional tournament called the Swamp Cup in Gainesville, Florida. In November 2011, 96 teams competed in the fifth World Cup on Randall's Island in New York. In 2012, hundreds of teams began to establish at other universities and colleges all over the United States. Now over 110 teams are members of the USQ. In July 2012 the International Quidditch Association hosted the Summer Games in Oxford, United Kingdom; these games were won by the United States. In September 2012, the United States quadball Association formed a referee development team which trains individuals to become referees in the sport. In 2013, quadball was televised for the first time in history in Toledo, Ohio featured on Buckeye Cable Sports Network. The televised match pitted Bowling Green State University against in-state rivals the University of Toledo, where BGSU swept Toledo in a best of three series.

Following a poll of members, USQ changed its name from "US Quidditch" to "US Quadball" in July 2022. The move was carried out jointly with Major League Quadball and cited what the organization considered to be Harry Potter author J. K. Rowling's anti-transgender stance and the ownership of "Quidditch" by Warner Bros. The name refers to the number of balls used in the sport and the number of positions held in the field.

Rules

Rulebook
As the sport has grown nationally, and globally, USQ has issued a number of rule books which have formed the basis of many other national leagues rules, with some using the USQ rules exactly whilst others, like Quidditch Canada and QuidditchUK, have alteredHOI their rules to best suit their leagues' play style. The current rulebook is the thirteenth edition.

Summary
A quadball arena consists of 3 hoops at each of the two shorter ends of the field. A team requires three chasers, one keeper, two beaters, and one seeker. Using the quaffle (volleyball) while riding broomsticks, the chasers are in charge of scoring points by passing, running, or kicking the ball to their teammates or into the hoops. The keeper guards the hoops and acts as a fourth chaser, while the beaters use bludgers (dodgeballs) to move players out of the way as a means of pushing and blocking. Beaters may also throw the bludgers at the opposing team as a means to "knock them out," causing them to have to tag their own hoop before rejoining play. The seeker must catch the snitch, a neutral person who has attached a Golden Snitch (a yellow velcro tail) to the back of their waist; catching the snitch is worth 30 points. The match ends once the snitch is caught by a seeker. If the snitch is caught and the score is tied, the game goes into overtime. Quadball is a uniquely gender-inclusive contact sport - following the "four maximum" rule. This means that there can be no more than four players of the same gender on the field at the same time; when the seekers are released, this number increases to five.

Teams in the US 
Teams are either collegiate- or community-based. Teams registered with the USQ are divided into eight regions: Northeast, Mid-Atlantic, Midwest, Great Lakes, West, South, Southwest, and Northwest.

National team

References

External links

Quidditch governing bodies
Sports governing bodies in the United States
Sports organizations of the United States
2005 establishments in the United States